City mysteries are a 19th-century genre of popular novel, in which characters explore the secret underworlds of cities and reveal corruption and exploitation, depicting violence and deviant sexuality. They were popular in both Europe and the United States. All were inspired by the very successful serial novel The Mysteries of Paris (1842) by Eugène Sue, such as these:

 Les Vrais Mystères de Paris (1844) by Eugène François Vidocq
 Los misterios de Madrid: miscelánea de costumbres buenas y malas con viñetas y láminas á pedir de boca (1844) by Juan Martínez Villergas
 The Quaker City, or The Monks of Monk Hall (1845) by George Lippard
 Los Misterios del Plata (1846) by Juana Manso
 Venus in Boston (1849) by George Thompson
 City Crimes (1849) by George Thompson
 Life and Adventures of Jack Engle (1852) by Walt Whitman 
 The Mysteries of Lisbon (1854) by Camilo Castelo Branco
 The Slums of Petersburg (1866) by Vsevolod Krestovsky
 Les Mystères de Marseille (1867) by Émile Zola
 The Mysteries of London (1844) by George W. M. Reynolds
 Les Mystères de Londres by Paul Féval
 Les Mystères de Lyon (featuring the Nyctalope) by Jean de La Hire
 I misteri di Napoli by Francesco Mastriani, 
 Les Nouveaux Mystères de Paris by Léo Malet, 
 Die Mysterien von Berlin by August Brass, 
 Die Geheimnisse von Hamburg by Johann Wilhelm Christern, 
 De Verborgenheden van Amsterdam by L. van Eikenhorst

Crime fiction
Literary genres